The Baku suburban railway or Absheron Circular line is a  commuter rail service which began in 2019, serving the Azerbaijani capital Baku.

Background

In 2016, Chairman of Azerbaijan Railways Javid Gurbanov confirmed that work was underway on a  railway line to Heydar Aliyev International Airport from Baku's main station.

In 2018, president Ilham Aliyev announced funding for a suburban rail service for Baku. The 100 million manat project was to include upgrading the existing railway between Baku and Sumqayıt via Biləcəri, as well as bring back into use the disused route connecting the two cities via Sabunçu and Pirşağı. The plans included 23 stations on the route, which would also have branches to Dübandi and Maştağa, with a branch serving the airport being built in a later phase.

The initial phase of the service was launched in May 2019, connecting Baku station with Sabunçu via four intermediate stations. By 2020, the line was extended to Sumqayit, linking to the existing Baku–Sumqayit railway to form a circle line.

Stations

At its 2019 opening, the suburban railway served seven stations. In 2020 seven stations were added, bringing the total to 14.

 Baku Central
 Keshla
 Koroğlu
 Bakıxanov
 Sabunçu
 Zabrat 1
 Zabrat 2
  Məmmədli
 Pirşağı
 Goradil
 Novxanı
 Sumqayit
 Xırdalan
 Biləcəri

History
The first Elektrichka ran on July 6, 1926, along the Baku–Sabunchi line in Soviet Azerbaijan.

Rolling stock

Current 

ESh2-019 (since 2019)

Former 

ER9 (1926-2004)

Future plans 

13 more stations are planned toward to the east, including Baku International Airport.

See also
 Trams in Baku
 Baku Metro
 Baku Transport Agency
 Transport in Azerbaijan

References

External links

Rail transport in Azerbaijan
2019 establishments in Azerbaijan
Railway lines opened in 2019